JL Ranch is a 2016 American Western television film directed by Charles Robert Carner and written by Harley Peyton. It stars Jon Voight, Teri Polo, James Caan, Melanie Griffith, Steven Bauer, Grant Bowler, and Trevor Donovan. It was broadcast on the Hallmark Movies & Mysteries channel on August 21, 2016. It was released in Europe as Texas Blood.

Plot
Veteran rancher and former sheriff John Landsburg must face federal bureaucracy when an old enemy, Tap Peterson, alleges John does not actually own the family's Texas ranch.

Cast 
 Jon Voight as John Landsburg
 Teri Polo as Rebecca Landsburg
 James Caan as Tap Peterson
 Melanie Griffith as Laura Lee Schafer
 Steven Bauer as Hector Arrieta
 Abby Brammell as Regan Landsburg
 Grant Bowler as Sheriff Henry Whitlock
 Trevor Donovan as Brady Landsburg
 Nathan Keyes as Terrence
 Lee Purcell as Mable Ritter
 Skyler Shaye as Lynn Landsburg
 Kevin Lingle as Agent in Charge
 Shane Woodson as Ethan Petersen
 Cory Scott Allen as McCarthy
 Clarke Vesty is Jon Voight's double and appears as a ranch hand

Production 
Principal photography on the film began in mid-January 2016 in Kentucky, with Charles Robert Carner directing and Crystal Sky Pictures' Steven Paul producing from a script by Harley Peyton and music by Eric Allaman.

References

External links 
 
 

2016 television films
2016 Western (genre) films
Crystal Sky Pictures films
Hallmark Channel original films
Films directed by Charles Robert Carner
Films shot in Kentucky
American Western (genre) television films
2016 films
2010s English-language films